High Ridge Township is a township in Jefferson County, Missouri.

The township was so named on account of its lofty elevation.

References

Townships in Missouri
Townships in Jefferson County, Missouri